Assisi Hospice is a hospice in Singapore which provides palliative care to terminally ill patients.

History

Founded in 1969 by the Catholic order Franciscan Missionaries of the Divine Motherhood as Assisi Home for the poor and sick, and was reconstituted as Assisi Hospice in 2007. It is owned and run by the Franciscan Missionaries of the Divine Motherhood.

The Franciscan Missionaries of the Divine Motherhood (FMDM) Sisters have a long tradition of providing healthcare. In 1949, the local government invited a small group of FMDM Sisters for a nursing post in the Tuberculosis Section of Tan Tock Seng Hospital in Singapore. The Sisters were also nursing leprosy patients at the Trafalgar Home and staffing the School of Nursing there.

Anticipating their services would no longer be needed after Singapore's recovery from the Japanese Occupation, the Sisters saved their hard earned salaries to build up a fund for the eventual building of a private Catholic hospital. These 10 years savings were augmented by generous donations from both companies and individuals.

On 4 March 1961, Mount Alvernia Hospital was officially opened. In 1969, donations from the late Mr Khoo Teck Puat saw the building of an extension of Mount Alvernia Hospital. The beds in this block are for chronically ill patients.

In 1986, the Khoo block started accepting respite patients. The building eventually became known as Assisi Home. Assisi Home derived its name from the birthplace of Saint Francis, the Founder of the Franciscan Movement.

In March 1988, the Congregation of the Franciscan Missionaries of the Divine Motherhood expanded into the area of Hospice Care. Hence Assisi began to admit only cancer patients requiring respite and hospice care. In 1992, the Sisters vacated their convent and refurbished it into a new hospice.

Assisi Home & Hospice was officially opened in April 1993 by the then President of Singapore, the late Mr Wee Kim Wee.

In 1993, Assisi discontinued the admission of patients for long-term care and focused on hospice care for the terminally ill cancer patients. Assisi Home & Hospice was changed to Assisi Hospice as a statement of our steadfast commitment to this mission.

A centre for compassionate and personalised palliative care, Assisi Hospice has also admitted patients with non-cancer diagnoses as it recognise the significant suffering even among those with other life limiting illnesses. This is consistent with its core values to serve all adults and children who need of palliative and hospice care.

Facilities and services

Assisi Hospice provides in-patient hospice care, day-care facilities, and home care support. In 2011, it cared for 444 in-patients, 101-day-care patients, and 675 home-care patients, the vast majority of whom were from public hospitals.

As of 2012, Assisi Hospice had a capacity of 37 beds and 90 staff, of which five were full-time doctors trained in palliative care. It also had 570 volunteers in its database.

New building

The current building occupied by Assisi hospice used to be a convent belonging to the Franciscan Missionaries of the Divine Motherhood nuns.

in 2012, after an open tender and design competition held to appoint a team of Multi-Disciplinary Team of Consultants. The final team, led by architect and lead consultant New Space Architects Private Limited, was appointed after a rigorous selection process.

Assisi Hospice moved to its new premises in January 2017. Sited next to its current building and costing SGD 70 million, the new six-storey building will be able to serve more than 2,000 patients a year, double the 1,000 patients it has been serving. There are now 85 beds, up from 37.  Its groundbreaking ceremony was held on 29 July 2013.

On 30 November 2013, philanthropist Khoo Bee See, daughter of the late banker-philanthropist Khoo Teck Puat, pledged SGD 1 million to Assisi Hospice, one of the largest by an individual to the hospice.

Beds

The six-storey building spread over 5,515 sq m of land will have 48 single rooms, with the rest being two- or four-bed rooms.

Dementia & Paediatric Wards

The new hospice will also have a specialised 16-bed ward for dementia patients and a dedicated paediatric palliative care ward, both of which will be the first of their kind in Singapore.

The dementia-friendly palliative care ward will have a 'closed loop' leading to and from the ward through a bridge and sensory garden to prevent patients from wandering out of the ward.

The paediatric ward will have child-friendly features, as well as a playground and garden.  The hospice will offer play therapy and art therapy.

Daycare Centre

The new hospice will also have a larger daycare centre, which will be able to serve 50 patients, 20 more than it currently does.

Ambulatory Treatment Unit

The new hospice will also offer an ambulatory (or walking) treatment unit which will render urgent medical help for patients who do not need to be admitted as an in-patient.

Family-Friendly Features

The new hospice will have a chapel, a labyrinth for meditative walks, a "kopitiam"-type dining area for patients and their families, and two family rooms where families of patients can stay the night.

Training & Education

A Centre for Palliative Care Education and Therapy will be established in the new building to train health-care professionals and volunteers in palliative care. This will include a centre for grief and bereavement education, which will carry out training as well as public awareness programmes.

Staffing

The hospice will increase its number of home palliative care teams from three to five to help 500 more patients. It will also increase its number of staff to 250, including 12 full-time doctors.

References

External links
Assisi Hospice
Singapore Hospice Council
Ministry of Health (Singapore): Inpatient Hospice Care

Hospices
Medical and health organisations based in Singapore
1969 establishments in Singapore